The 2011–12 season was Atalanta Bergamasca Calcio's 104th season in existence, and its first season back in Serie A following promotion the 2011–12 Serie A started on 30 July.

Players

Competitions

Serie A

Matches
The fixtures for the 2011–12 Serie A season were announced by the Lega Serie A on 27 July.

Coppa Italia

Appearances and goals

|-
! colspan=10 style=background:#DCDCDC; text-align:center| Goalkeepers

|-
! colspan=14 style=background:#DCDCDC; text-align:center| Defenders

|-
! colspan=14 style=background:#DCDCDC; text-align:center| Midfielders

|-
! colspan=14 style=background:#DCDCDC; text-align:center| Forwards

|-
! colspan=14 style=background:#DCDCDC; text-align:center| Players transferred out during the season

Goalscorers

Last updated: 13 May 2012

References

External links
 Official Atalanta BC Website
 Tutto Atalanta: Atalanta News & Gossip

Atalanta B.C. seasons
Atalanta